Shacheng railway station  is a railway station on the Beijing–Baotou railway, Fengtai–Shacheng railway, located in Shacheng town, Huailai County, Zhangjiakou, Hebei.

History
The station opened in 1909.

See also
List of stations on Jingbao railway

References

Railway stations in Hebei
Railway stations in China opened in 1909